Mahadipur Kalan is a village in Shaheed Bhagat Singh Nagar district of Punjab State, India. The village is administrated by Sarpanch an elected representative of the village.

Demography 
As of 2011, Mahadipur Kalan has a total number of 34 houses and population of 154 of which 85 include are males while 69 are females according to the report published by Census India in 2011. The literacy rate of Mahadipur Kalan is 82.44%, higher than the state average of 75.84%. The population of children under the age of 6 years is 23 which is 14.94% of total population of Mahadipur Kalan, and child sex ratio is approximately 533 as compared to Punjab state average of 846.

Most of the people are from Schedule Caste which constitutes 94.81% of total population in Mahadipur Kalan. The town does not have any Schedule Tribe population so far.

As per the report published by Census India in 2011, 42 people were engaged in work activities out of the total population of Mahadipur Kalan which includes 41 males and 1 females. According to census survey report 2011, 95.24% workers describe their work as main work and 4.76% workers are involved in Marginal activity providing livelihood for less than 6 months.

Education 
KC Engineering College and Doaba Khalsa Trust Group Of Institutions are the nearest colleges.

List of schools nearby:
Dashmesh Model School, Kahma
Govt Primary School, Kahlon
Govt High School, Garcha

Transport 

See also 
List of villages in India

References

External links 
 Tourism of Punjab
 Census of Punjab
 Locality Based PINCode

Villages in Shaheed Bhagat Singh Nagar district